Bwlchyfadfa is a hamlet in the community of Llandysul, Ceredigion, Wales, which is 64.9 miles (104.4 km) from Cardiff and 182.5 miles (293.8 km) from London. Bwlchyfadfa is represented in the Senedd by Elin Jones (Plaid Cymru) and is part of the Ceredigion constituency in the House of Commons.

See also 
 List of localities in Wales by population

References 

Villages in Ceredigion